Rino Genovese (1905–1967) was an Italian film actor.

Selected filmography
 Naples of Former Days (1938)
 Malaspina (1947)
 Madunnella (1948)
 The City Stands Trial (1952)
 Perdonami! (1953)
 Altair (1956)

References

Bibliography
 Piero Pruzzo & Enrico Lancia. Amedeo Nazzari. Gremese Editore, 1983.

External links

1905 births
1967 deaths
Male actors from Naples
Italian male film actors
20th-century Italian male actors